John-Jules is a surname. Notable people with the surname include:

 Danny John-Jules (born 1960), British actor, singer, and dancer
 Tyreece John-Jules (born 2001), English footballer

Compound surnames